The 1960 United States presidential election in South Dakota took place on November 8, 1960, as part of the 1960 United States presidential election. Voters chose four representatives, or electors, to the Electoral College, who voted for president and vice president.

South Dakota was won by incumbent Vice President Richard Nixon (R–California), running with United States Ambassador to the United Nations Henry Cabot Lodge, Jr. of Massachusetts, with 58.21% of the popular vote, against Massachusetts Senator John F. Kennedy (D), running with Texas Senator Lyndon B. Johnson, with 41.79% of the popular vote.

, this is the last election in which majority Native American Todd County voted for a Republican presidential candidate. With 58.21% of the popular vote, South Dakota would prove to be Nixon's fifth strongest state in the 1960 election after Nebraska, Kansas, Oklahoma and Vermont.

Primaries
Both the Republican and Democratic parties held primaries on June 7.

Democratic primary

Hubert Humphrey was unopposed on the Democratic primary ballot. Kennedy had decided against competing in the state because he recognized that Humphrey, who had grown up in the state, had a distinct advantage there.

Republican primary

No candidates ran in the Republican primary.

Results

Results by county

See also
 United States presidential elections in South Dakota

References

South Dakota
1960
1960 South Dakota elections